Austere is an anonymous, obscurantist electronic music group that has covered a wide variety of styles in their releases: Classical Minimalism, psybient, psychedelic ambient, ambient, dark ambient, drone, glitch-ambient, and downtempo-style drum and bass music, which out of deference to Coil they spell "musick." The group started working together in 1997, with their first release on 1 January 1998, and is loosely based in the Pacific Northwest in Portlandia, Oregon due to their connection to Sound-O-Mat Recordings which is located there.

The two members have lived in various places, such as New York City, NY; North Chatam UK, UK; Portlandia, OR; Seattle, WA; Brighton, UK and SF, CA amongst many more.

Their Classical Minimalism recordings: "Convergence", "Eco", "Pulse" and "Vox" all draw upon composer Steve Reich's Process Music approach, as defined by his 1968 manifesto "Music as a Gradual Process."

They have collaborated with a number of musicians/bands including Abstract Audio Systems (New York City), In The Now (Brighton, UK) and Stephen Philips, owner of Dark Duck Records.

They have contributed to videos and films: the soundtrack for The Thin Horizon, an independent film written, directed and produced by Michael Peters of Artifexwerks located in Forest Grove, Oregon; a track from the Dark Duck Records Drone Download Project was used Claude's Room, also an independent film. They have also contributed to several music videos, such as the Abandon video, and most recently, the Tiny Danser.

Austere's members have recorded solo works, as The Mystifying Oracle and Freq. Magnet.  The latter has released three full CDs, a DVD, and a recent track on a Hypnos compilation CD.

Discography 

The discography of Austere, includes thirteen studio albums, four extended play CDEPs, ten compilation appearances, including several on Hypnos and a 6-hour compilation box set of previously released and three unreleased tracks.

Albums

EPs

Compilations

Soundtracks

DVDs

short form

All Austere releases are distributed by the ambient label Hypnos Records, and the band has signed with the labels Hypnos and Blue Water Records in 2007.

Older logo

External links
 Band Web Site
 The Mystifying Oracle - solo side-project, ethnic-styled psybient musick
 Freq. Magnet - solo side-project, guitar-only ambient musick

References

Electronic music groups from Oregon
Musical groups established in 1998
1998 establishments in Oregon
Musical groups from Portland, Oregon